Cambarus nerterius, the Greenbrier cave crayfish, is a species of crayfish in the family Cambaridae. It is endemic to the state of West Virginia in the United States. It is found only in or immediately adjacent to caves in Greenbrier and Pocahontas counties, and is included on the IUCN Red List as a Near Threatened species.

References

Cambaridae
Cave crayfish
Crustaceans of the United States
Endemic fauna of West Virginia
Freshwater crustaceans of North America
Crustaceans described in 1964
Taxa named by Horton H. Hobbs Jr.
Greenbrier County, West Virginia
Pocahontas County, West Virginia
Taxonomy articles created by Polbot